Indeed! is the debut album by jazz trumpeter Lee Morgan released on the Blue Note label in 1957. It was recorded on November 4, 1956 and features performances by Morgan, Clarence Sharpe, Horace Silver, Wilbur Ware and Philly Joe Jones.

Reception
The Allmusic review awarded the album 3 stars.

Track listing 
 "Roccus" (Silver) - 8:18
 "Reggie of Chester" (Golson) - 4:55
 "The Lady" (Owen Marshall) - 6:47
 "Little T." (Byrd) - 8:23
 "Gaza Strip" (Owen Marshall) - 3:56
 "Stand By" (Golson) - 5:51
 "Little T." [Alternate Take] - 8:07 Bonus track on CD reissue

Personnel 
 Lee Morgan - trumpet
 Horace Silver - piano
 Clarence Sharpe - alto saxophone
 Wilbur Ware - bass
 Philly Joe Jones - drums

References 

Hard bop albums
Lee Morgan albums
1957 debut albums
Blue Note Records albums
Albums produced by Alfred Lion
Albums recorded at Van Gelder Studio